Eulepidotis punctilinea is a moth of the family Erebidae first described by William Schaus in 1921. It is found in the Neotropics, including Costa Rica, Honduras and Guatemala.

References

Moths described in 1921
punctilinea